Guy Luzon (born 7 August 1975) is an Israeli former footballer and manager, currently managing the Israel national under-21 football team.

Club career
Guy Luzon was a graduate of the Maccabi Petah Tikva youth program, joining Maccabi Petah Tikva at the age of 10. Luzon started playing for the first team at the age of 18, making his debut against Beitar Tel Aviv in 1992. He played for Maccabi Petah Tikva for 3 years, until an injury caused him to retire at the age of 21 in 1996.

Managerial career

After Luzon's retirement from football, he was offered a job to coach the Maccabi Petah Tikva youth team, under head coach Eli Ohana. Luzon took over as manager after Ohana in the 2001–02 Israeli Premier League season, leading Maccabi to finish in 8th place. Luzon's biggest success at Maccabi was winning the Toto Cup in 2004 along with placing second in the 2004–05 Israeli Premier League and qualifying for the UEFA Cup 2nd Qualifying Round. Luzon was appointed by Hapoel Tel Aviv before the beginning of the 2007–08 Israeli Premier League season, however he resigned on November 25, 2007 when Hapoel was bottom of the league with only 6 points. Luzon returned to coach Maccabi Petah Tikva, however he resigned after only a few months, on April 6, 2008, because of several losses. On June 12, 2008, Luzon was appointed as manager of Bnei Yehuda, leading them to the 2009–10 UEFA Europa League, where they had several victories before being knocked out by PSV Eindhoven in the play-off round.

On August 4, 2010 Luzon was appointed to coach the Israel national under-21 football team, with which he competed at the 2013 UEFA European Under-21 Championship because Israel qualified automatically as hosts. Luzon led the Israeli U-21 team to a 3rd-place finish in Group A, including a victory against the England U-21's. Luzon was appointed by Standard Liège on May 27, 2013, which was met with protests from some of the Standard fans. However, Luzon exceeded expectations, leading Standard to a second-place finish in the 2013–14 Belgian Pro League and qualifying for the 2014–15 UEFA Champions League, where they lost in the play-off round to Zenit Saint Petersburg. On October 20, 2014 Luzon was dismissed from his job at Standard because of the poor results in the beginning of the season.

On January 13, 2015, Luzon was appointed as head coach of Charlton Athletic. His first game in charge of Charlton Athletic was a 0-0 tie with Wolverhampton Wanderers on January 24, 2015. Luzon's first win as Charlton Athletic's coach was a 3-0 win against Brentford on February 14, 2015.

Luzon was sacked by Charlton on 24 October 2015.

On 13 February 2017, Luzon was appointed the manager of Maccabi Haifa.

Managerial statistics

Honours

As a player
Toto Cup:
Winner (1): 1994–95

As a manager
Toto Cup:
Winner (1): 2003–04
Israeli Premier League:
Runner-up (1): 2004–05
Israel State Cup:
Runner-up (1): 2010
Belgian Pro League:
Runner-up (1): 2013–14

References

External links

1975 births
Living people
Israeli Jews
Israeli footballers
Maccabi Petah Tikva F.C. players
Israeli Premier League managers
Maccabi Petah Tikva F.C. managers
Hapoel Tel Aviv F.C. managers
Bnei Yehuda Tel Aviv F.C. managers
Standard Liège managers
Charlton Athletic F.C. managers
Maccabi Haifa F.C. managers
Beitar Jerusalem F.C. managers
Israeli people of Libyan-Jewish descent
Expatriate football managers in Belgium
Expatriate football managers in England
Israeli expatriate sportspeople in Belgium
Israeli expatriate sportspeople in England
English Football League managers
Association football midfielders
Israeli football managers